The Great Mall may refer to:
Great Mall of the Bay Area in Milpitas, California
The Great Mall of the Great Plains in Olathe, Kansas
Great Mall of Las Vegas, an unbuilt project in Las Vegas, Nevada